Santa Teresa County Park is an  park in the Santa Teresa neighborhood of San Jose, California, located within the Santa Teresa Hills

Park description
It is operated by the Santa Clara County Parks and Recreation Department. Most of the park consists of non-native grassland and mixed oak woodland.  Native wildflowers displays are common in late winter and early spring in the serpentine soil in the northwest and southern sections of the park.  Elevations range from 64 m (210 ft) in the northeast section to 352 m (1155 ft) at Coyote Peak in the eastern section. The park offers over 17 miles of unpaved trails for equestrian, hiking and bicycle use. Some of the trails are steep around Coyote Peak. Picnicking by groups and families is a popular activity in Santa Teresa County Park, namely in the Pueblo Day Use area.

The park also contains a picnic area in the Pueblo Day Use Area, an 18 hole golf course operated by a concessionaire, and an archery range.

The main entrance to the park is a large parking lot by the Pueblo Day Use Area and is accessible via Bernal Road from the east.  Other entrances with limited or no parking include the Bernal-Joice-Gulnac Ranch in the northwest, an entrance from Avenida Espana on the northeast, and the Stile Ranch entrance from Almaden Valley.

References 

 County of Santa Clara Parks and Recreation Department, park brochure and map.  Usually available at  Pueblo Day Use Area and Bernal-Joice-Gulnac Ranch.

External links

 Ronald Horii's Santa Teresa County Park page
 Friends of Santa Teresa County Park
 Santa Clara County Department of Parks and Recreation page for Santa Teresa County Park
 Santa Teresa County Park Guide Map

Parks in San Jose, California
Bay Area Ridge Trail